Lucien-Marie Pautrier (2 August 1876, in Aubagne – 9 July 1959, in Strasbourg) was a French dermatologist.

Biography 
He studied medicine in Marseille and Paris, where he was steered towards dermatology by Émile Leredde, and subsequently worked with dermatologist Louis-Anne-Jean Brocq at the Hôpital Saint-Louis. He served as a medical officer to a field artillery regiment in World War I, during which, he was awarded the Croix de Guerre for bravery and became a chevalier in the Légion d’Honneur (1916).

Following the end of hostilities, he became a professor of dermatology at the University of Strasbourg, where he established a worldwide reputation. In 1942 he accepted the chair of dermatology at the University of Lausanne, and after World II, returned as a professor to Strasbourg, where he retired two years later. In retirement, he pursued interests in art and music, and founded the Société des Amis de la Musique in Strasbourg.

Associated medical terms 
His name is associated with the term "Pautrier's microabscesses" in mycosis fungoides, even though he was not the first to describe them. Other dermatological terms that contain his name are:
 "Brocq-Pautrier angiolupoid" (with Louis-Anne-Jean Brocq): a specific form of sarcoidosis of the skin.
 "Brocq-Pautrier syndrome" (with Louis-Anne-Jean Brocq): rhomboid and shiny lesions on the midline of base of the tongue. Also known as glossitis rhombica mediana.
 "Pautrier-Woringer syndrome" (with Frédéric Woringer): another name for lymphadenopathia dermatopathica lipomelanotica.

Published works 
From 1921 to 1938 he was editor of the "Travaux de la Clinique des Maladies cutanées et syphilitiques". The following is a list of some of his numerous medical works:
 Les tuberculoses cutanées atypiques (tuberculides), Paris: C. Naud, 1903.
 Glossite losangique médiane de la face dorsale de la langue (with L. Brocq) "Annales de dermatologie et de syphilographie", Paris, 1914, 5: 1-18.
 L'Anatomie pathologique des chéloïdes (with Frédéric Woringer), Extrait des "Annales de dermatologie et de syphiligraphie", VIIe série, t. II, n° 11, November 1931.
 À propos de l'hypothèse d'une maladie lichéno-sclérodermique, Extrait du "Bulletin de la Société française de dermatologie et de syphiligraphie", December 1933.
 Acné comédonienne indurée, phlegmoneuse, à ponts fibreux, à chéloïdes vraies sur acné, Extrait des "Annales de dermatologie et de syphiligraphie", March 1934.
 Syndrome de Heerfordt et maladie de Besnier-Boeck-Schaumann. Bull Soc Med Hop Paris, 1937, 53: 1608.

References 

1876 births
1959 deaths
People from Aubagne
Academic staff of the University of Strasbourg
Academic staff of the University of Lausanne
French dermatologists
Grand Officiers of the Légion d'honneur
20th-century French physicians